Events in the year 1697 in Norway.

Incumbents
Monarch: Christian V

Events

Eidsfos Verk is established.

Arts and literature

The construction of Oslo Cathedral was finished.

Births
12 January – Knud Leem, linguist (d.1774).

Deaths
 30 July – Lorentz Mortensen Angell, merchant and landowner (born 1626).

See also

References